Fort Defiance may refer to:

Canada
Fort Defiance (British Columbia), winter quarters for American Captain Robert Gray

United States
 Fort Defiance, Arizona, an unincorporated community
 Fort Defiance (California), formerly Roop's Fort, located in Susanville
 Fort Morris, Georgia, known as Fort Defiance during the War of 1812
 Fort Defiance (Illinois), a Civil War post commanded by General Ulysses S. Grant, site of Fort Defiance Park
 Fort Defiance State Park near Estherville, Iowa
 Fort Defiance (Maryland), a War of 1812 fort on the Elk River
 Fort Defiance (Massachusetts), a 19th-century fort in Gloucester
 Fort Defiance (Brooklyn), a fort in the neighborhood of Red Hook, Brooklyn, New York during the American Revolution
 Fort Defiance (Lenoir, North Carolina), former plantation home of General William Lenoir
 Fort Defiance (Ohio), in present-day Defiance, Ohio
 Fort Defiance, Tennessee, in Clarksville TN, later renamed Fort Bruce
 Fort Defiance, briefly the name of the Presidio La Bahía in Goliad, Texas during the Texas Revolution
 Fort Defiance (Vermont), a fort in Vermont
 Fort Defiance, Virginia, an unincorporated community
 Fort Defiance (Wisconsin), a fort during the Black Hawk War

In film
Fort Defiance (film), a 1951 Western directed by John Rawlins